Ningbo metropolitan area consists of the following cities:

 Ningbo (core city),  
 Zhoushan
 Taizhou
 Shaoxing: Shengzhou County, Xinchang County

It is positioned as the leading region of the Yangtze River Economic Belt and the strategic fulcrum of the "One Belt, One Road " strategy, forming a two-way radiation between the ocean and the hinterland.

History 
The history of Ningbo Metropolitan Area dates back to 1726 AD in Qing Dynasty. The  is a historical political division of China that includes the 4 current cities of Zhejiang Province in China: Ningbo, Zhoushan, Shaoxing, and Taizhou.

References 

Metropolitan areas of China